Edo is a masculine given name. Notable people with the name include:

Arts
 Edo van Belkom (born 1962), Canadian author
 Edo Bertoglio (born 1951), Swiss photographer and film director
 Edo Brunner (born 1970), Dutch actor and presenter
 Edo Castro (born 1957), American jazz bassist and composer
 Edo de Waart (born 1941), Dutch conductor
 Edo Kovačević (1906–1993), Croatian artist
 Edo Maajka (born 1978), Bosnian rapper, record producer, and songwriter
 Edo Mulahalilović (1964–2010), Bosnian songwriter and producer
 Edo Murtić (1921–2005), Croatian painter
 Edo Peročević (1937–2007), Croatian actor

Sports
 Edo Benetti (born 1941), Australian rules football player
 Edo Buma (born 1946), Dutch field hockey player
 Edo Hafner (born 1955), Slovenian ice hockey player
 Edo Marion (1910–2002), Yugoslav fencer
 Edo Murić (born 1991), Slovenian basketball player
 Edo Ophof (born 1959), Dutch footballer
 Edo Patregnani (1938–2013), Italian footballer
 Edo Terglav (born 1980), Slovenian ice hockey player
 Edo Vanni (1918–2007), American baseball player, manager, and executive

Others
 Edo Belli (1918–2003), American architect
 Edo Ronchi (born 1950), Italian engineer and politician
 Edo Šen (1877–1949), Croatian architect
 Edo Shigenaga (fl. 1180), second head of the Edo clan

See also
 Edo (surname)
 EDO (disambiguation)

Masculine given names